Vincent Montgomery Rue is an American psychotherapist and advocate for government bans on abortion, as well as the founder and co-director (along with his wife, Susan Stanford-Rue, who is also a psychotherapist) of the now-inactive Institute for Pregnancy Loss. He says he has treated many women who have had painful abortion experiences, and who have wished that they had received more information before having their abortions.

Abortion and mental health
He is known for being one of the first to propose a link between abortion and mental health problems, which he dubbed post-abortion syndrome when testifying before Congress in the early 1980s. Post-abortion syndrome is not recognized by as a condition by the American Psychological Association or the American Psychiatric Association. In 1987, Rue presented a paper titled "The Psychological Aftermath of Abortion: A White Paper"—to the then-surgeon general, C. Everett Koop, who rejected it. Since the 1980s, Rue has, along with fellow anti-abortion activists Priscilla K. Coleman and David Reardon, published a number of studies indicating that abortion increases women's risk of mental health problems, such as major depressive disorder and bipolar disorder, though the Pro-Choice Action Network says that these studies only establish correlation, which does not necessarily prove a causal relationship. The Guttmacher Institute says that a study published by Rue et al. in the Journal of Psychiatric Research in 2009 included all mental health problems with which women were diagnosed over their entire lifetimes, thus negating the argument that these disorders were caused by having abortions.

Criticism
In 1992, Rue's testimony in the Planned Parenthood v. Casey case was thrown out by a district judge, who concluded that it was not credible. In 2014, judge Myron Herbert Thompson criticized the state of Alabama for hiring Rue to defend anti-abortion legislation.

References

American anti-abortion activists
University of North Carolina at Greensboro alumni
Living people
American psychotherapists
Year of birth missing (living people)